Brea, was a town of Chalcidice, in ancient Macedonia.

The site of Brea is about 4 miles (6.5 km) south of Nea Syllata.

References

Populated places in ancient Macedonia
Former populated places in Greece
Geography of ancient Chalcidice